Sergia Galván Ortega (Hato Mayor del Rey, 1955) is a Dominican feminist activist, teacher, and counselor. She joined the feminist movement in 1979 and has worked since to advocate for women's rights, both from within women's organizations and as a part of political and social movements.

In 1980 she worked with Accion Femenina Incorporada (AFI) (Women's Action Incorporated), a left feminist organization that collaborates with Mujeres Amas de Casa (Women Housewives).

Galván was part of the delegation of Dominican women who participated in the First Feminist Encounter of Latin America and the Caribbean held in Bogotá, Colombia, in 1981. 

Galvan continues to represent women in the countryside and the city. In 1984, she joined the Dominican Center for Education Studies in the Women's Program, one of the prominent NGOs in the country. That same year, together with other women groups, she founded the Colectiva Mujer y Salud (Women and Health Collective), an organization focused on women's health and sexuality.

Between 1989 and 1992, Galván lived in Mexico, where she took Women's Studies courses at the Universidad Metropolitana Mexico and was employed at the Centro de Investigación de América Latina y el Caribe CIDAL (Research Center of Latin America and the Caribbean).

Activism 
Galván's activism led her to coordinate the first convention of Black Women in Latin America and the Caribbean, which was held in the Dominican Republic in 1992. Galván was the Co-Founder of La Red de Mujeres Afrodescendientes de América Latina y Caribe (Network of Afro-Descendant Women of Latin America and the Caribbean) as well as Co-Founder of the Movimiento por la identidad de la Mujer Negra (Movement for the Identity of Black Women) in the Dominican Republic. 

At the international level, she has been part of various organizations and networks:  La Red de Salud de las Mujeres de América Latina y el Caribe (Women's Health Network of Latin America and the Caribbean), where she currently is part of its board of directors; the Red Feminista de Investigación y acción del Caribe, CAFRA (Caribbean Association for Feminist Research and Action); El Comité de América Latina por los Derechos de las Mujeres; and CLADEM (Latin American Committee for Women's Rights).

Sergia Galván was the first Dominican to be part of the expert committee to follow up on the implementation of the Convention of Belém Do Pará. She was also an Alternate Delegate before the Inter-American Commission of Women of the OAS [add year], a member of the Women's Committee of Latin America and the Caribbean preparatory for the Human Rights Conference held in 1993 in Vienna, a member of the Women's Committee of Latin America and the Caribbean preparatory for the Beijing Conference held in 1995 in China, and a member of the International Committee to Follow up the Durban Conference against racism [add year] .

Galván has advocated for abortion rights for decades, and was part of a months-long protest in 2021 demanding that the government include the three exceptions to the Dominican Republic's total abortion ban (known as the tres causales) in the criminal code.

Political career 
In the late 1970s, she was a soldier in the liberal Comités Revolucionarios Camilo Torres (CORECATO) and later in the Socialist Movement of the MST  (Movimiento Dos Trabalhadores Rurais Sem Terra, or the Landless Workers Movement), a militant group. Galvan left these to pursue work in the social and feminist movements. In 2015, Galván joined Minou Tavárez Mirabal in the process of building the Partido Opción Democrática (Democratic Choice Party).

As a member of the Democratic Choice Party, Galván is a member of the Political Directorate and leads the Secretariat for Women. She was a candidate for deputy by Circumscription No. 1 of the National District in the 2016 Minou Coalition, in box No. 23 of the Alliance for Democracy APD but was not elected.

In 2021 she confirmed that she has served as a technical advisor to the Ministerio de la Mujer (Ministry of Women). 

In 2023 she joined the Board of Directors of Ipas, a reproductive health nonprofit focused on access to abortion and contraception.

References

See Also 

 Ochy Curiel

Further reading 

 Peguero JR. La conferencia de Beijing no lleno nuestras expectativas. Entrevista a Sergia Galvan [The Beijing conference did not meet our expectations. Interview with Sergia Galvan]. Rev CEPAE. 1995 Oct;15(66):8-12. Spanish. PMID: 12291595.
 Robert Lee Adams Jr (2012) Rewriting the African Diaspora in the Caribbean and Latin America: beyond disciplinary and national boundaries, African and Black Diaspora: An International Journal, 5:1, 3-20, DOI: 10.1080/17528631.2012.629430

Dominican Republic women's rights activists
Dominican Republic women activists
Dominican Republic feminists
1955 births
People from Hato Mayor del Rey
Living people